Faltis is a surname of central European origin. Notable people with the surname include:

 Evelyn Faltis (1887–1937), Bohemian composer
 Otto Faltis (1888–1974), Austrian businessman

See also
 Fallis (surname)

Surnames of European origin